William Ridgley Morris (1811February 27, 1889) was an American politician and diplomat.

Morris, son of Dr. William Morris, a prominent physician of Dover, Delaware, was born in Dover in 1811.

After graduation from Yale College in 1830, he studied law for three years with the Hon. John M. Clayton, in Dover, and soon after his admission to the bar was elected clerk of the Delaware State Senate.   At the close of the session he settled in York, Pa., where he became prosecuting attorney for York County, and soon secured a good practice. In President Zachary Taylor's administration (1849) he was appointed Consul at St. Thomas, and on his return from that post resumed the practice of his profession, in Philadelphia, from which city he was chosen the next year as a representative to the Pennsylvania State Legislature. In the spring of 1856 he returned to Dover and established himself on a fruit farm near the town, where he attended mainly to agricultural pursuits and indulged his genius for poetical composition during the rest of his life. In 1858 he was nominated for Congress by the so-called People's party, but was defeated by a small majority. During the American Civil War he was a strong supporter of the Union, and after the war had closed he held for a time a position in one of the government departments at Washington. He died at his home near Dover, on February 27, 1889, at the age of 78.

References

External links

1811 births
1889 deaths
American diplomats
Yale College alumni
People from Dover, Delaware
Pennsylvania lawyers
Members of the Pennsylvania House of Representatives
19th-century American politicians
19th-century American lawyers